The Bass River is a  stream in Ottawa County, Michigan. It flows into the Grand River and thence into Lake Michigan.  At the Bass River's Grand River mouth is the Bass River State Recreation Area.

See also
List of rivers of Michigan

References

Rivers of Michigan
Rivers of Ottawa County, Michigan
Tributaries of Lake Michigan